Peter Scott Traugott (born November 16, 1965) is an American television producer who is currently the President of Keshet Studios.

Career
Born in Los Altos, California, Traugott majored in business at UC Berkeley in California. He then worked as an investment banker before attending Harvard Business School. Traugott's career soon took off after business school when he landed a creative executive job at Fox Studios. He then joined Brillstein-Grey Entertainment as a Vice President of Television in 1996 and was promoted to President when Brad Grey left to run Paramount in 2005. He is married to Mandana Dayani, founder of I am a voter., attorney and media executive.

Recently appointed President of Keshet Studios, he is the Executive Producer of Lincoln Rhyme: The Hunt for the Bone Collector (NBC), The Beauty and the Baker (ABC), and the critically acclaimed Our Boys (HBO).  Traugott has developed numerous television pilots including Real Time with Bill Maher, According to Jim, and The Showbiz Show with David Spade. He served as executive producer of Samantha Who? starring Christina Applegate, and for the Sarah Michelle Gellar series Ringer. Traugott also executive-produced Gellar's unsold HBO pilot The Wonderful Maladys.

References

 http://www.deadline.com/2011/06/peter-traugott-closes-3-year-overall-deal-with-ums/
 http://www.variety.com/article/VR1118038493?refcatid=4076
 https://www.nytimes.com/2010/06/27/fashion/weddings/27DAYANI.html
 http://dornsife.usc.edu/news/stories/875/a-passion-for-fashion/

External links
 

1965 births
American television producers
Harvard Business School alumni
Living people
Haas School of Business alumni